Fulton County is a county in the U.S. state of Illinois. According to the 2010 census, it had a population of 37,069. Its county seat is Lewistown, and the largest city is Canton. Fulton County comprises the Canton, IL Micropolitan Statistical Area, which is part of the Peoria-Canton, IL Combined Statistical Area.

History
Fulton County was organized in 1823 from Pike County.  It is named for Robert Fulton, developer of the first commercially successful steamboat. American poet and writer Edgar Lee Masters lived in Fulton County during the 1890s; he later became famous for the Spoon River Anthology, written in 1915.  Fulton County was home to Camp Ellis during World War II.

The county is known for the annual Spoon River Scenic Drive, which occurs the first 2 weekends in October. This has been a tradition since 1968 and attracts thousands of participants from all over the country.

Fulton County is home to the Ogden-Fettie Site, a significant site for Havana Hopewell Native culture. It is the largest collection of Woodland Mounds in Illinois, with 35 Mounds, dating from 400 BC, arranged in a crescent.

Geography

Fulton County is the site of Dickson Mounds Museum, a state museum of Native American daily life in the Illinois River valley.

Climate and weather

Adjacent counties

 Warren County - northwest
 Knox County - north
 Peoria County - northeast
 Tazewell County - east
 Mason County - south
 Schuyler County - southwest
 McDonough County - west

National protected area
 Emiquon National Wildlife Refuge

Transportation

Major highways

  US Route 24
  US Route 136
  Illinois Route 9
  Illinois Route 41
  Illinois Route 78
  Illinois Route 95
  Illinois Route 97
  Illinois Route 100
  Illinois Route 116

Airport
The county contains one public-use airport: Ingersoll Airport (CTK), located in Canton.

Demographics

As of the 2010 United States Census, there were 37,069 people, 14,536 households, and 9,744 families residing in the county. The racial makeup of the county was 93.4% white, 3.4% black or African American, 0.4% American Indian, 0.3% Asian, 1.6% from other races, and 0.9% from two or more races. Those of Hispanic or Latino origin made up 2.4% of the population. In terms of ancestry, 23.7% were German, 19.1% were American, 14.0% were English, and 13.2% were Irish.

Of the 14,536 households, 29.3% had children under the age of 18 living with them, 52.0% were married couples living together, 10.2% had a female householder with no husband present, 33.0% were non-families, and 28.1% of all households were made up of individuals. The average household size was 2.37 and the average family size was 2.86. The median age was 41.9 years.

The median income for a household in the county was $41,268 and the median income for a family was $50,596. Males had a median income of $41,376 versus $28,596 for females. The per capita income for the county was $20,309. About 9.9% of families and 13.8% of the population were below the poverty line, including 22.2% of those under age 18 and 8.0% of those age 65 or over.

Communities

Cities
 Canton
 Cuba
 Farmington
 Lewistown (seat)

Town
 Astoria

Villages

 Avon
 Banner
 Bryant
 Dunfermline
 Ellisville
 Fairview
 Ipava
 Liverpool
 London Mills
 Marietta
 Norris
 Smithfield
 St. David
 Table Grove
 Vermont

Unincorporated communities

 Babylon
 Beaty
 Bernadotte
 Blyton
 Breeds
 Brereton
 Checkrow
 Depler Springs
 Duncan Mills
 Enion
 Fiatt
 Gilchrist
 Leesburg
 Little America
 Manley
 Maples Mill
 Marbletown
 Middlegrove
 Monterey
 Poverty Ridge
 Rawalts
 Sepo
 Seville
 Summum

Townships

 Astoria
 Banner
 Bernadotte
 Buckheart
 Canton
 Cass
 Deerfield
 Ellisville
 Fairview
 Farmers
 Farmington
 Harris
 Isabel
 Joshua
 Kerton
 Lee
 Lewistown
 Liverpool
 Orion
 Pleasant
 Putman
 Union
 Vermont
 Waterford
 Woodland
 Young Hickory

Bases

 Camp Ellis

Politics
In its early years, Fulton County favored the Democratic Party, being one of the northernmost Democratic counties and the nearest to Yankee, then solidly Republican Northern Illinois. It was never won by a Republican until the Democratic Party moved towards the Populist Party’s policies under William Jennings Bryan, a change which resulted in the county voting Republican except in landslide victories between 1896 and 1960. In that period, Franklin D. Roosevelt in 1932 and 1936 was the solitary Democratic presidential candidate to gain a majority of the county’s vote.

However, the 1964 election saw the county trend Democratic – so much so that Hubert Humphrey gained a narrow plurality in his 1968 election loss. Despite not going Democratic again until 1988, the party would always remain competitive in the county, and between 1988 and 2012 every Democratic presidential candidate gained a majority in Fulton County. However, concern over economic decline in the “Rust Belt” saw Donald Trump produce a dramatic swing in the 2016 election, winning Fulton County by fifteen percentage points and gaining the best GOP record in the county since 1980.

In popular culture
The fictional town of Lanford, Illinois in the sitcom Roseanne is set in Fulton County.

See also
 National Register of Historic Places listings in Fulton County, Illinois

Notes

References
Specific

General
 US Census Bureau 2007 TIGER/Line Shapefiles
 US Board on Geographic Names (GNIS)
 US National Atlas

External links
 Illinois State Archives
 Illinois Saving Graves: Fulton Co.

 
Illinois counties
1823 establishments in Illinois
Peoria metropolitan area, Illinois
Populated places established in 1823